The Punjab State Carrom Association (PSCA) is the Punjab, India state sport federation for the indigenous game of carrom, and is a state affiliate of the All India Carrom Federation (AICF), India's national branch of the International Carrom Federation (ICF). The PSCA was formed during 1996–97 in Sirhind, Punjab, Northern India. There were ten district associations affiliated with PSCA of which the Tarn Taran and Amritsar associations are the largest. The PSCA's headquarters are in Mohali, Punjab. Till November 20222, The association has organized 5 State championships and 1 National championship.

Officials
The PSCA has elected officers, including (as of 2018):
 President: Col. CS Bawa
 Executive President: Harjeet Singh
 Vice-president/Joint Secretary: Gurdeep Singh
 General Secretary: Gurinder Singh (Mohali); also a Joint Secretary of the North Zone Carrom Association (NZCA), an officer of two of the district PSCA affiliates, and a well-known tournament player
 Treasurer: SK Viz

Affiliated district associations

Amritsar District Carrom Association
ADCA affiliated with the PSCA on 14 February 2007. Because of the formation of new district called Tarn Taran, the officials of the ADCA shifted to the new Tarn Taran District Carrom Association, as the result of a meeting. ADCA was reformed subsequently, with new officers:
 Khalsa Gurbachan Singh – Patron in Chief
 Jaswant Singh – President
 Gurdev Singh – General Secretary
 Simranjit Singh – Treasurer

Mohali District Carrom Association

The largest number of players in national tournaments to date were MDCA members.  Officers include:
 Gurinder Singh – General Secretary (also General Secretary of PSCA, and officer of GTBSC)

MDCA players were champs at the state level and performed well in many nationals. It included Harpreet Singh, Amarpreet Singh Johal, Taranpreet Pahwa and Sukhpreet Kaur, among others.

Tarn Taran District Carrom Association
TTDCA(also Called TDCA) was formed in 2007 from ADCA, when Tarn Taran was declared as its own district that year, and the ADCA officers moved into the same positions in the TDCA. Its officials include:
 Balwinder Singh - General Secretary (also Vice-president of the PSCA)
 Rajinder Sharma - Committee Member
 Shanti Sharma - Committee Member

Longstanding TDCA player and coach Reeta Rani held 6th rank in the Youth National tournament held in at Alibag, Maharashtra. Other Notable players from TDCA includes Bholu Kapoor, Germanjeet Kaur, and Ramanpreet Kaur, among others.

Fatehgarh Sahib District Carrom Association (FSDCA)
FSDCA was formed in 1997. This association also conducted First Punjab State Carrom Championship. Notable players include Gurvinder Singh, Jatinder Pal Singh Batra, Harjatinder Singh, Vikrat Sharma.

Sangrur District Carrom Association (SDCA)
SDCA was formed in 2000. Heena Habib, Shahbaz Habib, Shamim Ahmed, Ammen Habib aka Payal Khan, Rubal Khan are notable players of the said association.

Patiala District Carrom Association (PDCA)
PDCA was made in year 2000. This association conducted seventh north zone carrom tournament. Harsimrat Singh is notable player of said association

Other associations
Following were other associations which remain inactive:
 Faridkot District Carrom Association (FDCA)
 Hoshiarpur District Carrom Association (HDCA)
 Jalandhar District Carrom Association (JDCA)
 Ropar District Carrom Association (RPCA)

Carrom Clubs under PSCA

Guru Tegh Bahadur Sports Club

The GTBSC was a Mohali District carrom club based at Mohali. This club was formed in 2006. This was first ever Carrom club in Mohali for said sport. The club was directly associated with the PSCA, rather than the Mohali District Carrom Association (MDCA), despite its location. The officers include:
 Mr. S.K. Viz - President
 Gurinder Singh (also General Secretary, PSCA and MHDC) - General Secretary and incoming President
 Mr. P. Singh Arora - Treasurer
 Mr. Sarabjit Singh - Committee Member

Carrom players of the GTBSC won top positions in state-level Carrom championships and performed well in several national tournaments. Apart from Carrom, the club was also active in table tennis, volleyball, and chess.

 This club is currently inactive.

Work and achievements

 The PSCA had organised two open state championships, one with FSDCA at Sirhind in August 2000, and he other with ADCA at Khadoor Sahib in 2002. PSCA General Secretary Gurinder Singh played an important role in the tournaments as an organizer. The tournaments were successful and helped raise local public interest in carrom. PSCA Vice-president Balwinder Singh also played an important role as an organizer in the second state championship even though he was ill at the time.
 A senior national and inter state Carrom championship was organized jointly by the PSCA and the Chandigarh Carrom Association (CCA), at Jalandhar, Punjab, under the auspices of the AICF, on 2 September–7, 2000, with PSCA General Secretary Gurinder Singh acting as Deputy Championship Director. This was also a great success for the PSCA. Twenty-six states and thirteen institutions participated in the event. Krishnan K. Sharma (President, ICF), Sarabjit Singh (President, AICF), S.K. Sharma (General Secretary, AICF) and many others congratulated PSCA and CCA for jointly undertaking the prestigious event.
 The PSCA conducted the Seventh North Zone Carrom Championship, at Vir Hakikat Rai Public Cchool, Patiala from 26 January–28, 2007. Punjab champions Heena Habib and Sukhpreet Kaur were subsequently selected to participate in the All India Zonal Tournament.
 The PSCA has also helped with multi-sport tournaments featuring carrom, held in Punjab.

Outstanding Players of PSCA

Men

Harpreet Singh
 Winner – Sub Junior - 1st Punjab state Carrom championship 2000.
 Stood 5th – Junior - 1st Punjab state Carrom championship 2000.
 Runner up – Junior – 2nd Punjab state Carrom championship 2002.
 Second Runner up – Senior – 2nd Punjab state Carrom championship 2002.
 Runner Up - Team Championship – 1st Punjab School State Carrom Championship.
 Winner – Individual Event - 1st Punjab School State Carrom Championship.
 Scholarship from NSI Patiala for winning in sub junior event in 1st Punjab state Carrom championship 2000.

Amarpreet Singh
 Second Runner Up – Sub Junior - 1st Punjab state Carrom championship 2000.
 Winner – Sub Junior – 2nd Punjab state Carrom championship 2002.
 Runner Up - Team Championship – 1st Punjab School State Carrom Championship.
 Second Runner Up – Individual Event - 1st Punjab School State Carrom Championship.
 Scholarship from NSI Patiala for winning in sub junior event in 2nd Punjab state Carrom championship 2002.

Shahbaz Habib
 Runner Up – Senior - 1st Punjab state Carrom championship 2000.
 Winner – Senior – 2nd Punjab state Carrom championship 2002.

Saurabh Sharma
 Winner – Junior – 1st Punjab state Carrom championship 2000.
 Winner – Senior – 1st Punjab state Carrom championship 2000.
 Left the PSCA and now playing from Haryana State Carrom Association.

Shamim Ahmed
 Second Runner up – senior – 1st Punjab state Carrom championship 2000.

Gurvinder Singh
 Runner up – Junior – 1st Punjab State Carrom Championship 2000
 Winner – Junior – 2nd Punjab state Carrom championship 2002.

Women

Heena Habib
 Runner Up – Senior - 1st Punjab state Carrom championship 2000.
 Winner – Senior – 2nd Punjab state Carrom championship 2002.
 Second Runner up in 1st north zone Carrom tournament.

Sukhpreet Kaur
 Winner – Sub Junior - 1st Punjab state Carrom championship 2000.
 Winner – Sub Junior – 2nd Punjab state Carrom championship 2002.
 Runner up – junior – 2nd Punjab state Carrom championship 2002.
 Runner up – Senior – 2nd Punjab state Carrom championship 2002.
 Winner – Individual Event - 1st Punjab School State Carrom Championship.
 6th Rank in 1st North Zone carrom Championship
 1st Scholarship from NSI Patiala for winning in sub junior event in 1st Punjab state Carrom championship 2000.
 2nd Scholarship from NSI Patiala for winning in sub junior event in 2nd Punjab state Carrom championship 2002.

Bholu Kapoor
 Winner – Junior - 2nd Punjab state Carrom championship 2002.
 Scholarship from NSI Patiala for winning in junior event in 2nd Punjab state Carrom championship 2002.

Reeta Rani
 Second Runner up – Senior – 2nd Punjab state Carrom championship 2002.
 6th in Youth National Championship at Alibagh.

Payal kha Aka Ammen
 Runner Up – Sub Junior – 1st Punjab state Carrom championship 2000.
 Runner Up – Sub Junior – 2nd Punjab state Carrom championship 2002.

Rubal Khan
 Second Runner Up – Senior - 1st Punjab state Carrom championship 2000.

Bhavneet Kaur
 Winner – Junior - 1st Punjab state Carrom championship 2000.
 Winner – Senior – 1st Punjab state Carrom championship 2000.

See also
 All-India Carrom Federation
 Carrom

References

 PSCA official website
 PSCA information at the MDCA website
 Seventh North Zone Carrom Championship website

Sports governing bodies in India
Carrom organisations
Sport in Mohali
Organisations based in Punjab, India
Sport in Punjab, India
1997 establishments in Punjab, India